Sophie Hunger (born Émilie Jeanne-Sophie Welti on 31 March 1983) is a Swiss singer-songwriter, film composer, multi-instrumentalist (guitar, blues harp, piano) and bandleader, currently living in Berlin.

Early life 
Émilie Jeanne-Sophie Welti was born on 31 March 1983 in Bern, Switzerland. She was a diplomat's daughter and grew up, with two older siblings, in Bern, London, Bonn and Zurich. She graduated high-school in 2002, then subsequently studied German and English.

While a child, Hunger took piano lessons for a time. She was familiar with jazz from an early age, since her father used to listen to it. Independently, she had a varying taste in music; as a teenager, she first was into hip-hop and R&B. Later she listened to rock – then, as a young adult, she discovered country, bluegrass and folk.

Career 

From 2002 to 2006, Hunger was a guest singer for the project Superterz and appears on the 2006 album Standards released by that group. Starting in 2004, Hunger was the lead singer of the indie rock group Fisher. The band split in 2007.

In 2006, in a few days, she home-recorded her solo début album, Sketches on Sea.

On 6 July 2008, Hunger and her band gave a concert in the Miles Davis Hall at the Montreux Jazz Festival, as well as Yael Naim and Camille. In July 2009, Hunger and her band closed out day 2 of TEDGlobal.

In June 2010, Sophie Hunger and her band played the John Peel stage at Glastonbury Festival. Sophie Hunger was the first Swiss artist that has ever played there. In July 2010 she played at the 100 Club, London, in October 2010 at The Roundhouse, London.

In late 2010, it was announced that Sophie Hunger would release a début record for the North American market as Sophie Hunger: s/t on Manimal Vinyl in April 2011. The CD contained tracks from 1983 and Monday's Ghost.

In 2011, her version of Noir Désir's "Le vent nous portera" was featured in the film Café de Flore, directed by Jean-Marc Vallée.

She features on "Song of I", a track from Steven Wilson's To The Bone album.

In 2012, The Swiss native mixes folk and pop influences with a liberal sprinkling of jazz. Her third album The Danger Of Light is refreshingly different - Hunger has a great voice, expressive and beguiling, yet also powerful when it needs to be. The closing Take A Turn is the simplest track of all, with just finger picked guitar and a harmonica giving it a more folky feel. It's soft and has a fragile purity that demonstrates just what a fine singer she is.

In 2015, her 5th album was released. Hunger is a musician who plays with pop structures and instrumentation while simultaneously taking bold, largely successful risks. She's an experimenter with an ear for hooks, and the songs of Supermoon twist and turn in delightfully surreal ways, while remaining endlessly accessible and inviting. Capable of veering between bold, reckless wit on "Superman Woman", with an almost childish enthusiasm, into hushed, fragile weariness on "Craze", the material from her latest album Supermoon - which features vocal contributions from Eric Cantona - is eclectic and surprising.

On August 31, 2018, Hunger released her fourth and most sonically diverse album to date in the form of Molecules. This time, Hunger, along with producer Dan Carey, has opted for synths and electronica to form the basis of the album. Recorded with Carey in South London, the album represents the biggest departure from what might be described as Hunger's signature sound to date, embracing a darker sonic identity and an altogether starker tonal palette.

In 2020, Sophie released "Halluzinationen". Earlier this year Fiona Apple's Fetch The Bolt Cutters almost broke Metacritic, such was the rapturous critical reception: along not-too-distant lines, there's a bountiful amount of idiosyncratic songwriting to enjoy here, too. Alt Swiss star Sophie Hunger has released another single from her Dan Carey sessions at Abbey Road studios. 'Everything Is Good' is part of a new album titled Halluzinationen.

Discography

Studio albums

Live albums

With the band Fisher, under the name Emilie Welti
 2006: Fisher – Fisher (Kuenschtli.ch)
 2006: Superterz: Standards

Singles

Soundtrack
as Emilie Welti
 2008: Der Freund (with Marcel Vaid):
 2010: Zimmer 202
as Sophie Hunger
 2016: My Life as a Courgette

Filmography
as Emilie Welti
 2008: Der Freund
 2012: Der Kumpel
as Sophie Hunger
 2012: The Rules of Fire
 2016: My Life as a Courgette

References

External links 

 
 
 Sophie Hunger on SoundCloud
 Sophie Hunger on BandCamp
 Sophie Hunger on YouTube
 
 Sophie Hunger statistics, tagging and previews at Last.FM

1983 births
Living people
English-language singers from Switzerland
Swiss film score composers
French-language singers of Switzerland
German-language singers of Switzerland
People from Bern
Musicians from Zürich
21st-century Swiss women singers
Swiss singer-songwriters
Swiss jazz musicians
Swiss guitarists
Multi-instrumentalists
Swiss harpists
Swiss pianists
Swiss women pianists
Participants in the Bundesvision Song Contest
21st-century Swiss musicians
21st-century pianists
21st-century guitarists
21st-century women guitarists
21st-century women pianists